This is a list of Israeli football transfers in the winter transfer window 2009–10 by club.

Israeli Premier league

Beitar Jerusalem

In:

Out:

Bnei Sakhnin

In:

Out:

Bnei Yehuda Tel Aviv

In:

Out:

F.C. Ashdod

In:

Out:

Hapoel Acre

In:

Out:

Hapoel Be'er Sheva

In:

Out:

Hapoel Haifa

In:

Out:

Hapoel Petah Tikva

In:

Out:

Hapoel Ra'anana

In:

Out:

Hapoel Ramat Gan

In:

Out:

Hapoel Tel Aviv

In:

Out:

Maccabi Ahi Nazareth

In:

Out:

Maccabi Haifa

In:

Out:

Maccabi Netanya

In:

Out:

Maccabi Petah Tikva

In:

Out:

Maccabi Tel Aviv

In:

Out:

Liga Leumit

Ahva Arraba

In:

Out:

Hakoah Amidar Ramat Gan

In:

Out:

Beitar Shimshon Tel Aviv

In:

Out:

Sektzia Nes Tziona

In:

Out:

Hapoel Ashkelon

In:

Out:

Hapoel Ironi Kiryat Shmona

In:

Out:

Maccabi Ironi Bat Yam

In:

Out:

References

External links
IFA Summary of second transfer window-season 2009/10 

Israel
Transfers Winter
2009-2010